Epipagis fenestralis is a moth in the family Crambidae. It is found in North America, where it has been recorded from North Carolina and Kentucky to Florida, Gulf States, Arkansas and Texas. It is also found in Costa Rica.

The wingspan is 20–25 mm. It is similar to Epipagis disparilis, but the antemedial line of the hindwings is broken and does not extend all the way across the wing.

References

Spilomelinae
Moths described in 1796